This is a list of notable events relating to the environment in 1993. They relate to environmental law, conservation, environmentalism and environmental issues.

Events
Residents in the vicinity of the polluted  Lago Agrio oil field hire lawyers to force former well operator Texaco and its now parent company Chevron Corporation to clean up the area and to provide for the care of those affected.
 The former New Zealand territorial authority district of Waitakere City declares itself to be an eco-city.

August
The Taejon Expo '93 three-month international exposition was held between Saturday, August 7, 1993, and Sunday, November 7, 1993, in the central South Korean city of Daejeon. The theme of the exposition was "The Challenge of a New Road of Development", with various other sub-themes related to sustainable and "green" development.

December
The Convention on Biological Diversity, known informally as the Biodiversity Convention, enters into force.  It is an international legally binding treaty.

See also

Human impact on the environment